Columbus Lee Harkins  (1864–1920) was a veterinary surgeon from Delaware, Oklahoma.

Life
C. L., or "Lum," as he was commonly known, was born in Georgia in 1864.  His parents moved to Missouri, then Kansas. Harkins earned a degree in veterinary medicine before moving to bordering Nowata County, Oklahoma, around 1900.  He practiced veterinary medicine, farmed, owned a boarding house, and owned and operated a merry go-round and other amusements at local carnivals and country picnics.  He was quite wealthy for the times, reportedly having a net worth of between $10,000.00 and $20,000.00.

Elsie Adams affair 
Harkins was charged in 1912 with the triple murder of Arvie and Safrania "Fronie" Hurst and their fifteen-year-old house guest, Elsie Adams, who was secretly pregnant with Harkins's child.  Evidence indicated all three victims had been dosed with morphine and/or potassium cyanide and their bodies doused with coal oil before their house burned down around 10:30 p.m., February 3, 1912.  Harkins had bought a bag of candy for Elsie after church that evening, and left her at the house around 9:30 p.m.  Prosecutors emphasized that Harkins was the last person to see Elsie Adams alive; and had both medical knowledge of poisons and a lascivious disposition toward young girls.  Harkins testified at his preliminary examination and admitted his relationship with the fifteen-year-old girl.  The defense attempted to show that the victims had been overcome by gas leaking from a faulty pipe, and died in a fireball explosion.

The ostensible motive for the murders was Harkins's anger at interference by Fronie Hurst, Elsie's brother Will Adams,  and perhaps others, in his plans to marry Elsie Adams.  She had told friends that she didn't care for Harkins, but stayed with him because she feared him and he had threatened her.    The Oklahoman reported that Harkins escaped lynching on the night of the fires only because they "couldn't get the other boys" to leave a meeting of the Democratic Club and join the mob.  Harkins denied the killings, but also testified at his preliminary hearing that if Bill Adams hadn't caused trouble for him, "the girl" would still be alive today.   The jury in Harkins's first murder trial failed to reach a verdict.  The 48 year-old Harkins then shocked the community by marrying Mary Golda Lockwood, then aged 22, after posting $12,500.00 bail to secure his appearance at the second trial.   The second jury also failed to reach a verdict, and Harkins was never convicted.

Harkins had been in trouble with the law several times before the Elsie Adams case. Feb 12, 1887 he was arrested for the alleged theft of a watch and money from a hotel in Arkansas City where he worked as a desk clerk. He was acquitted, but not until he started a rumor that his accuser, A.E. Kirkpatrick, had intimate relations with his own daughter.

In December 1888, Rebecca Detre of Parker Township, Montgomery County, Ks., accused him of bastardy. He was convicted of the charges and ordered to pay $100 a year until the boy was 15. The South Kansas Tribune excoriated him in an opinion piece that said it was "one of the filthiest cases of its class in years" and "exhibited the baseness and depravity of some young men," and how they "resort to base charges and insinuations against girls who would not associate with them" and finally suggested that parents horsewhip young men like him.

In 1901 he was found guilty of assault in an argument with another man over the hitching of a horse to a small tree.

In 1905 he found himself in federal court on charges of assault with intent to kill in a dispute with a man named Robert Hall. Harkins was driving a herd of cattle to Nowata, Oklahoma, when he encountered Hall and his 20-year old son. A dispute arose about a calf. Hall said Harkins came at him with a knife, but he was able to fight him off with his horse whip. Harkins managed to get these charges dismissed.

Inez Greenleaf affair 
In the fall of 1915, then 50 year-old Harkins was charged with raping twelve or thirteen year-old Inez Greenleaf. Like Elsie Adams, Inez Greenleaf met Harkins when she and her ailing and destitute mother were taken into Harkins's boarding house as charity three years earlier.  She recently had been visiting at the invitation of Harkins's wife, Mary, to help her with their two young children. Harkins had taken Inez Greenleaf along with him on a weekend trip to a Nowata County picnic to operate his merry-go-round.  She said he had raped her on the banks of a small creek not far from the picnic grounds.

Charges that the disgraced doctor had again raped a young local girl inflamed the public.  In mid-September, 1915, a mob gathered at the Nowata County Jail intent on lynching him.  Deputies escaped with Harkins to Bartlesville, Oklahoma and held him in the jail there.  He was bound over for trial and granted a change of venue to Rogers County, where he was tried in January, 1916.

In addition to testimony of Inez Greenleaf, the prosecution attempted, unsuccessfully, to show that Harkins had been convicted two decades earlier of raping a young girl in Kansas; charged with the child rape of his much younger wife, Mary Lockwood; and had illicit intercourse with the late Elsie Adams from the age of 12 or 13.  Harkins denied any wrongdoing in his trial testimony.  The jury in the Greenleaf case found him guilty but could not agree to the penalty.  The trial judge sentenced Harkins to fifty years in prison, and the case was affirmed in 1918 on appeal.

Death 
Harkins was stabbed to death on July 30, 1920, at Oklahoma State Penitentiary by an African-American fellow inmate, Charlie Walker, over a poker debt. Walker was convicted of Harkins's murder and sentenced to death by electrocution.  Concerned that Walker's trial and sentencing for Harkins's murder were influenced by racial prejudice, the Oklahoma Court of Criminal Appeals was unwilling to  sanction "the extreme penalty of the law," for the killing of a prisoner "in a fight over a gambling game," and modified Walker's death sentence to life imprisonment. Citing previous published cases, the Court remarked that the murdered prisoner Harkins was himself "a vicious and desperate criminal." Harkins is buried in an unmarked family grave in Coffeyville, Kansas.

References 

People from Nowata County, Oklahoma
American veterinarians
Male veterinarians
People acquitted of murder
American rapists
1864 births
1920 deaths